Freeman is Labyrinth's fifth album, released March 4, 2005 on Arise Records.

Track listing
"L.Y.A.F.H."* - 4:26
"Deserter" - 5:03
"Dive in Open Waters" - 3:10
"Freeman" - 4:16
"M3"** - 4:10
"Face and Pay" - 5:27
"Malcolm Grey" - 6:02
"Nothing New" - 5:03
"Infidels" - 5:55
"Meanings" - 3:56

* Stands for "Light Years Away From Here".
** Is a reference to the BMW M3 sports car.

2005 albums
Labyrinth (band) albums